Ian Crawley (14 May 1962 – 8 July 2008) was an English footballer. He played for a number of clubs throughout a long career and holds the distinction of having scored winning goals in two different finals at Wembley Stadium.

Crawley played for Kettering Town, Solihull Borough, Nuneaton Borough, VS Rugby and Telford United. It was with the latter two clubs that he achieved his notable double. In 1983, he scored the only goal as VS Rugby beat Halesowen Town 1–0 to win the FA Vase; six years later, he again was the scorer as Telford beat Macclesfield Town by the same score in the 1989 FA Trophy final.

Illness & death
Crawley was diagnosed with Motor neurone disease (known as Lou Gehrig's disease (ALS) in North America) in 2006 and was dealt a further blow when it was discovered that he was also suffering from terminal pancreatic cancer. Before his death, an appeal was launched in his name to raise money and awareness of the disease.

References

English footballers
Telford United F.C. players
Kettering Town F.C. players
Nuneaton Borough F.C. players
Tamworth F.C. players
Footballers from Coventry
Deaths from motor neuron disease
Deaths from pancreatic cancer
Neurological disease deaths in England
Deaths from cancer in England
1962 births
2008 deaths
Association football forwards